= Shyama Surgical Sansthan =

Shyama Surgical Sansthan is a well-known hospital in city of Kathalwari, Darbhanga in the state of Bihar. Operating from year 2001 it is one of the leading healthcare provider in Darbhanga.
